The 2018 Campeonato Ecuatoriano de Fútbol Serie A (officially known as the Campeonato Ecuatoriano - Copa Lubricantes Havoline 2018 for sponsorship reasons) was the 60th season of the Serie A, Ecuador's top tier football league. Emelec were the defending champions. First stage winners LDU Quito defeated second stage winners and defending champions Emelec 2–1 on aggregate in the final (third stage) to win their eleventh domestic title.

Teams
Twelve teams competed in the 2018 Serie A season, ten of whom took part in the previous season. Clan Juvenil and Fuerza Amarilla were relegated from the Serie A after accumulating the fewest points during the 2017 season. They were replaced by Técnico Universitario and Aucas, the 2017 Serie B winner and runner-up, respectively. Técnico Universitario were in their 25th top-flight appearance and their first one since 2012, while Aucas returned to the Serie A for their 37th appearance after just one season in the second tier.

Stadia and locations 

a: Guayaquil City played its home matches between February and early-June at Estadio Monumental Banco Pichincha and Estadio George Capwell in Guayaquil due to remodeling works at Estadio Christian Benítez Betancourt.

Personnel and kits

Managerial changes

First stage
The First stage began on February 16 and is scheduled to end on July 16.

Results

Second stage
The Second stage began on July 20 and ended on December 8.

Results

Third stage
LDU Quito and Emelec qualified to the Finals (Third stage) by being the First stage and Second stage winners, respectively. The winners were the Serie A champions and earned the Ecuador 1 berth in the 2019 Copa Libertadores, and the losers were the Serie A runners-up and earned the Ecuador 2 berth in the 2019 Copa Libertadores. By having the greater number of points in the aggregate table, LDU Quito played the second leg at home.

LDU Quito won 2–1 on aggregate.

Aggregate table

Copa Sudamericana playoff
The Copa Sudamericana playoff was played between:
 Aucas (Aggregate table 4th best team not qualified for 2019 Copa Libertadores)
 Mushuc Runa (2018 Serie B champions)

The winners qualified for the 2019 Copa Sudamericana first stage.

Mushuc Runa won 3–2 on aggregate.

Top goalscorers

Source: FEF

References

External links
Official website 

Ecuadorian Serie A seasons
Campeonato Ecuatoriano de Fútbol Serie A
Serie A